The Pontifical Council for Dialogue with Non-Believers was a dicastery of the Roman Curia charged with promoting dialogue between the Catholic Church and non-believers.

Its original designation as "Secretariat" was changed to "Pontifical Council" on 30 June 1988.

The  was merged into the Pontifical Council for Culture in 1993.

References

Pontifical councils
Former departments of the Roman Curia
Christian organizations established in 1965
Religious organizations disestablished in 1993
1965 establishments in Vatican City
1993 disestablishments in Italy